Teen Top's Rising 100% is a South Korean variety show featured on the Seoul Broadcasting System (SBS) and produced by MTV. A total of ten episodes of the series were aired from June 10, 2012 to August 18, 2012. The show, labeled a 'real variety' show, was hosted by Kim Tae Hyun and included the bands Teen Top and 100%. Each week, the two bands competed to win the support of fans and earn prizes.  The SBS MTV outing was viewed as a success, with the producers moving forward on new episodes under the title Teen Top and 100%.

Episode summary

Episodes

South Korean variety television shows